is an English trusts law case, concerning the requirements for a trust to be properly constituted, and the operation of constructive trusts. The case represents an equitable exception to the need for a complete transfer of property in law.

Facts
Mrs Ada Crampton wanted to transfer her 400 shares in a company called Crampton Bros. (Coopers) Ltd to her nephew, Harold. She asked Mr Pennington, who represented the company's auditors, to prepare a share transfer form. She filled it in and gave it back to Mr Pennington. Mr Pennington put it on the auditors’ files but never gave it on to the company for the registration of shares in Harold's name to be completed. Ada died. The other people who stood to inherit, (including Philip Waine) argued that unlike Re Rose, Ada had not done all she could have, because she had not handed the completed transfer form to Harold or the company. Harold contended that the shares were held on trust for him, so that the transfer must be completed.

Judgment
The Court of Appeal held that the shares did indeed belong to Harold.

Arden LJ held that it would have been unconscionable for Ada to change her mind and go back on the transfer. Ada had given the transfer form to Pennington so that he could do the registration. She had told Harold about the gift, and no action on his part was necessary. Moreover, Harold had agreed to be a company director, for which a shareholding was needed.

Clarke LJ held that equitable title could transfer without registration. Completion of forms and delivery to a company was enough in Re Rose, but it should be recognised that delivery to the company was not a further essential step. It was enough that the transfer was intended to have immediate effect. He said the following.

Schiemann LJ concurred with Arden LJ.

Subsequent case
Curtis v Pulbrook considered what constitutes "unconscionable” in Pennington v Waine. It suggested that donee's acting to his detriment in reliance on the promised gift is essential, making the situation a form of proprietary estoppel.

See also

English trusts law
English land law
English property law

Notes

English trusts case law
Court of Appeal (England and Wales) cases
2002 in case law
2002 in British law